The 1999 Abia State House of Assembly election was held on January 9, 1999, to elect members of the Abia State House of Assembly in Nigeria. All the 24 seats were up for election in the Abia State House of Assembly.

Results

Osisioma South 
APP candidate Donatus Nwankpa won the election.

Umuahia North 
PDP candidate Nkem Chris Ike won the election.

Umuahia Central 
PDP candidate Stanley Ohajuruka won the election.

Isiala Ngwa North 
PDP candidate Christopher Enweremadu won the election.

Isiala Ngwa South 
APP candidate Remigius Nji won the election.

Isuikwuato 
PDP candidate Ernest Osita Igbe won the election.

Umuahia East 
APP candidate Dan Egbogu won the election.

Umunneochi 
PDP candidate Matthew Ibeh won the election.

Ukwa West 
PDP candidate Ngozi Ulunwa won the election.

Ukwa East 
PDP candidate Emeka Stanley won the election.

Obingwa East 
PDP candidate Eric Acho Nwakanma won the election.

Obingwa West 
PDP candidate Chima Ochieze won the election.

Umuahia South 
APP candidate Ndukwe Adindu won the election.

Ikwuano 
PDP candidate Wisdom Ogbonna won the election.

Ugwunagbo 
PDP candidate James Maraizu won the election.

Ohafia North 
PDP candidate Tony Okoro Kalu won the election.

Aba Central 
PDP candidate Nnamdi Egege won the election.

Osisioma North 
PDP candidate Kingsley Mgbeahuru won the election.

Aba North 
APP candidate Blessing Azuru won the election.

Arochukwu 
PDP candidate Sampson Orji won the election.

Aba South 
APP candidate Obioma Ekpem won the election.

Bende North 
PDP candidate Lekwauwa Orji won the election.

Bende South 
PDP candidate Emenike Okoroafor won the election.

Ohafia South 
PDP candidate Bernard Orji won the election.

References 

Abia State House of Assembly elections
January 1999 events in Nigeria
Abia